Ña or Nya is the tenth consonant of Indic abugidas. It is derived from the early "Ashoka" Brahmi letter .

Historic Nya
There are three different general early historic scripts - Brahmi and its variants, Kharoṣṭhī, and Tocharian, the so-called slanting Brahmi. Nya as found in standard Brahmi,  was a simple geometric shape, with variations toward more flowing forms by the Gupta . The Tocharian Nya  did not have an alternate Fremdzeichen form. The third form of nya, in Kharoshthi was probably derived from Aramaic separately from the Brahmi letter.

Brahmi Nya
The Brahmi letter , Nya, is probably derived from the altered Aramaic Nun , and is thus related to the modern Latin N and Greek Nu. Several identifiable styles of writing the Brahmi Nya can be found, most associated with a specific set of inscriptions from an artifact or diverse records from an historic period. As the earliest and most geometric style of Brahmi, the letters found on the Edicts of Ashoka and other records from around that time are normally the reference form for Brahmi letters, with vowel marks not attested until later forms of Brahmi back-formed to match the geometric writing style.

Tocharian Nya
The Tocharian letter  is derived from the Brahmi , but does not have an alternate Fremdzeichen form.

Kharoṣṭhī Nya
The Kharoṣṭhī letter  is generally accepted as being derived from the altered Aramaic Nun , and is thus related to N and Nu, in addition to the Brahmi Nya.

Devanagari script

Ña (ञ, Sanskrit and Hindi: ञकार ñakāra) is the tenth consonant of the Devanagari abugida. It ultimately arose from the Brahmi letter , after having gone through the Gupta letter . Letters that derive from it are the Gujarati letter ઞ, and the Modi letter 𑘗.

Devanagari-using Languages
Like all Indic scripts, Devanagari uses vowel marks attached to the base consonant to override the inherent /ə/ vowel:

Conjuncts with ञ

Devanagari exhibits conjunct ligatures, as is common in Indic scripts. In modern Devanagari texts, most conjuncts are formed by reducing the letter shape to fit tightly to the following letter, usually by dropping a character's vertical stem, sometimes referred to as a "half form". Some conjunct clusters are always represented by a true ligature, instead of a shape that can be broken into constituent independent letters. Vertically stacked conjuncts are ubiquitous in older texts, while only a few are still used routinely in modern Devanagari texts. The use of ligatures and vertical conjuncts may vary across languages using the Devanagari script, with Marathi in particular preferring the use of half forms where texts in other languages would show ligatures and vertical stacks.

Ligature conjuncts of ञ
True ligatures are quite rare in Indic scripts. The most common ligated conjuncts in Devanagari are in the form of a slight mutation to fit in context or as a consistent variant form appended to the adjacent characters. Those variants include Na and the Repha and Rakar forms of Ra. Nepali and Marathi texts use the "eyelash" Ra half form  for an initial "R" instead of repha.
 Repha र্ (r) + ञ (ña) gives the ligature rña: 

 Eyelash र্ (r) + ञ (ña) gives the ligature rña:

 ञ্ (ñ) + rakar र (ra) gives the ligature ñra:

 ञ্ (ñ) + न (na) gives the ligature ñna:

Devanagari Jña

One of the most common true ligatures in Devanagari is the conjunct jña ज्ञ. This ligature is a required form for most Devanagari languages, and the conjunct even has its own half form that freely joins other letters in horizontal conjuncts.
 ज্ (j) + ञ (ña) gives the ligature jña:

 Repha र্ (r) + ज্ (j) + ञ (ña) gives the ligature rjña:

 Eyelash र্ (r) + ज্ (j) + ञ (ña) gives the ligature rjña:

 भ্ (bʰ) + ज্ (j) + ञ (ña) gives the ligature bʰjña:

 ब্ (b) + ज্ (j) + ञ (ña) gives the ligature bjña:

 छ্ (cʰ) + ज্ (j) + ञ (ña) gives the ligature cʰjña:

 च্ (c) + ज্ (j) + ञ (ña) gives the ligature cjña:

 ढ্ (ḍʱ) + ज্ (j) + ञ (ña) gives the ligature ḍʱjña:

 ड্ (ḍ) + ज্ (j) + ञ (ña) gives the ligature ḍjña:

 द্ (d) + ज্ (j) + ञ (ña) gives the ligature djña:

 घ্ (ɡʱ) + ज্ (j) + ञ (ña) gives the ligature ɡʱjña:

 ग্ (g) + ज্ (j) + ञ (ña) gives the ligature gjña:

 ह্ (h) + ज্ (j) + ञ (ña) gives the ligature hjña:

 ज্ (j) + ज্ (j) + ञ (ña) gives the ligature jjña:

 झ্ (jʰ) + ज্ (j) + ञ (ña) gives the ligature jʰjña:

 ख্ (kʰ) + ज্ (j) + ञ (ña) gives the ligature kʰjña:

 क্ (k) + ज্ (j) + ञ (ña) gives the ligature kjña:

 ल্ (l) + ज্ (j) + ञ (ña) gives the ligature ljña:

 म্ (m) + ज্ (j) + ञ (ña) gives the ligature mjña:

 न্ (n) + ज্ (j) + ञ (ña) gives the ligature njña:

 ञ্ (ñ) + ज্ (j) + ञ (ña) gives the ligature ñjña:

 ङ্ (ŋ) + ज্ (j) + ञ (ña) gives the ligature ŋjña:

 फ্ (pʰ) + ज্ (j) + ञ (ña) gives the ligature pʰjña:

 प্ (p) + ज্ (j) + ञ (ña) gives the ligature pjña:

 श্ (ʃ) + ज্ (j) + ञ (ña) gives the ligature ʃjña:

 स্ (s) + ज্ (j) + ञ (ña) gives the ligature sjña:

 ष্ (ṣ) + ज্ (j) + ञ (ña) gives the ligature ṣjña:

 थ্ (tʰ) + ज্ (j) + ञ (ña) gives the ligature tʰjña:

 त্ (t) + ज্ (j) + ञ (ña) gives the ligature tjña:

 ठ্ (ṭʰ) + ज্ (j) + ञ (ña) gives the ligature ṭʰjña:

 ट্ (ṭ) + ज্ (j) + ञ (ña) gives the ligature ṭjña:

 व্ (v) + ज্ (j) + ञ (ña) gives the ligature vjña:

 य্ (y) + ज্ (j) + ञ (ña) gives the ligature yjña:

Stacked conjuncts of ञ
Vertically stacked ligatures are the most common conjunct forms found in Devanagari text. Although the constituent characters may need to be stretched and moved slightly in order to stack neatly, stacked conjuncts can be broken down into recognizable base letters, or a letter and an otherwise standard ligature.
 भ্ (bʰ) + ञ (ña) gives the ligature bʰña:

 ब্ (b) + ञ (ña) gives the ligature bña:

 छ্ (cʰ) + ञ (ña) gives the ligature cʰña:

 च্ (c) + ञ (ña) gives the ligature cña:

 ढ্ (ḍʱ) + ञ (ña) gives the ligature ḍʱña:

 ड্ (ḍ) + ञ (ña) gives the ligature ḍña:

 ध্ (dʱ) + ज্ (j) + ञ (ña) gives the ligature dʱjña:

 ध্ (dʱ) + ञ (ña) gives the ligature dʱña:

 द্ (d) + ञ (ña) gives the ligature dña:

 घ্ (ɡʱ) + ञ (ña) gives the ligature ɡʱña:

 ह্ (h) + ञ (ña) gives the ligature hña:

 झ্ (jʰ) + ञ (ña) gives the ligature jʰña:

 ख্ (kʰ) + ञ (ña) gives the ligature kʰña:

 क্ (k) + ञ (ña) gives the ligature kña:

 ळ্ (ḷ) + ञ (ña) gives the ligature ḷña:

 ल্ (l) + ञ (ña) gives the ligature lña:

 म্ (m) + ञ (ña) gives the ligature mña:

 ङ্ (ŋ) + ञ (ña) gives the ligature ŋña:

 न্ (n) + ञ (ña) gives the ligature nña:

 ञ্ (ñ) + ब (ba) gives the ligature ñba:

 ञ্ (ñ) + च (ca) gives the ligature ñca:

 ञ্ (ñ) + ज (ja) gives the ligature ñja:

 ञ্ (ñ) + ल (la) gives the ligature ñla:

 ञ্ (ñ) + ञ (ña) gives the ligature ñña:

 ञ্ (ñ) + व (va) gives the ligature ñva:

 फ্ (pʰ) + ञ (ña) gives the ligature pʰña:

 प্ (p) + ञ (ña) gives the ligature pña:

 श্ (ʃ) + ञ (ña) gives the ligature ʃña:

 स্ (s) + ञ (ña) gives the ligature sña:

 ष্ (ṣ) + ञ (ña) gives the ligature ṣña:

 थ্ (tʰ) + ञ (ña) gives the ligature tʰña:

 त্ (t) + ञ (ña) gives the ligature tña:

 ठ্ (ṭʰ) + ञ (ña) gives the ligature ṭʰña:

 ट্ (ṭ) + ञ (ña) gives the ligature ṭña:

 व্ (v) + ञ (ña) gives the ligature vña:

 य্ (y) + ञ (ña) gives the ligature yña:

Bengali script
The Bengali script ঞ is derived from the Siddhaṃ , and is marked by no horizontal head line, and a less geometric shape than its Devanagari counterpart, ञ. The inherent vowel of Bengali consonant letters is /ɔ/, so the bare letter ঞ will sometimes be transliterated as "nyo" instead of "nya". Adding a "okar" (ও-কার), the "o" vowel mark, gives a reading of /ɲo/.
Like all Indic consonants, ঞ can be modified by marks to indicate another (or no) vowel than its inherent "a".

ঞ in Bengali-using languages
ঞ is used as a basic consonant character in all of the major Bengali script orthographies, including Bengali and Assamese.

Conjuncts with ঞ
Bengali ঞ exhibits conjunct ligatures, as is common in Indic scripts, with a mix of both stacked and linear ligatures.
 চ্ (c) + ঞ (ña) gives the ligature cña:

 জ্ (j) + ঞ (ña) gives the ligature jña:

 ঞ্ (ñ) + চ (ca) gives the ligature ñca:

 ঞ্ (ñ) + ছ (cʰa) gives the ligature ñcʰa:

 ঞ্ (ñ) + জ (ja) gives the ligature ñja:

 ঞ্ (ñ) + ঝ (jʰa) gives the ligature ñjʰa:

 ষ্ (ṣ) + ঞ (ña) gives the ligature ṣña:

Gurmukhi script
Ñaññā (ਞ,  ñaññā) is a consonant of Gurmukhi. It is represented in Shahmukhi with  nun gunnah or  nun.

Gujarati Ña
Ña (ઞ) is a consonant of the Gujarati abugida. It is derived from the Devanagari Ña , and ultimately the Brahmi letter .

Ña (ઞ) is a consonant of the Gujarati abugida. It is derived from the Devanagari Ña  with the top bar (shiro rekha) removed, and ultimately the Brahmi letter .

Gujarati-using Languages
The Gujarati script is used to write the Gujarati and Kutchi languages. Like all Indic scripts, Gujarati uses vowel marks attached to the base consonant to override the inherent /ə/ vowel:

Conjuncts with ઞ

Gujarati ઞ exhibits conjunct ligatures, much like its parent Devanagari Script. Most Gujarati conjuncts can only be formed by reducing the letter shape to fit tightly to the following letter, usually by dropping a character's vertical stem, sometimes referred to as a "half form". A few conjunct clusters can be represented by a true ligature, instead of a shape that can be broken into constituent independent letters, and vertically stacked conjuncts can also be found in Gujarati, although much less commonly than in Devanagari. 
True ligatures are quite rare in Indic scripts. The most common ligated conjuncts in Gujarati are in the form of a slight mutation to fit in context or as a consistent variant form appended to the adjacent characters. Those variants include Na and the Repha and Rakar forms of Ra.
 ર્ (r) + ઞ (ɲa) gives the ligature RÑa:

 ઞ્ (ɲ) + ર (ra) gives the ligature ÑRa:

 જ્ (j) + ઞ (ɲa) gives the ligature JÑa:

 ર્ (r) + જ (ja) ઞ (ɲa) gives the ligature RJÑa:

 જ (ja) + ઞ્ (ɲ) + ર (ra) gives the ligature JÑRa:

 ઞ્ (ɲ) + ન (na) gives the ligature ÑNa:

Javanese script

Telugu Ña

Ña (ఞ) is a consonant of the Telugu abugida. It ultimately arose from the Brahmi letter . It is closely related to the Kannada letter ಞ. Since it lacks the v-shaped headstroke common to most Telugu letters, ఞ remains unaltered by most vowel matras, and its subjoined form is simply a smaller version of the normal letter shape.
Telugu conjuncts are created by reducing trailing letters to a subjoined form that appears below the initial consonant of the conjunct. Many subjoined forms are created by dropping their headline, with many extending the end of the stroke of the main letter body to form an extended tail reaching up to the right of the preceding consonant. This subjoining of trailing letters to create conjuncts is in contrast to the leading half forms of Devanagari and Bengali letters. Ligature conjuncts are not a feature in Telugu, with the only non-standard construction being an alternate subjoined form of Ṣa (borrowed from Kannada) in the KṢa conjunct.

Malayalam Ña

Ña (ഞ) is a consonant of the Malayalam abugida. It ultimately arose from the Brahmi letter , via the Grantha letter  Nya. Like in other Indic scripts, Malayalam consonants have the inherent vowel "a", and take one of several modifying vowel signs to represent syllables with another vowel or no vowel at all.

Conjuncts of ഞ
As is common in Indic scripts, Malayalam joins letters together to form conjunct consonant clusters. There are several ways in which conjuncts are formed in Malayalam texts: using a post-base form of a trailing consonant placed under the initial consonant of a conjunct, a combined ligature of two or more consonants joined together, a conjoining form that appears as a combining mark on the rest of the conjunct, the use of an explicit candrakkala mark to suppress the inherent "a" vowel, or a special consonant form called a "chillu" letter, representing a bare consonant without the inherent "a" vowel. Texts written with the modern reformed Malayalam orthography, put̪iya lipi, may favor more regular conjunct forms than older texts in paḻaya lipi, due to changes undertaken in the 1970s by the Government of Kerala.
 ഞ് (ñ) + ച (ca) gives the ligature ñca:

 ഞ് (ñ) + ജ (ja) gives the ligature ñja:

 ജ് (j) + ഞ (ña) gives the ligature jña:

 ഞ് (ñ) + ഞ (ña) gives the ligature ñña:

Thai script
Yo Ying (ญ) is the thirteenth letter of the Thai script. It falls under the low class of Thai consonants. In IPA, yo ying is pronounced as [j] at the beginning of the syllable and [n] at the end of syllable and in Old Thai, it was pronounced as [ɲ], Thai consonants do not form conjunct ligatures, and use the pinthu—an explicit virama with a dot shape—to indicate bare consonants. In the acrophony of the Thai script, ying (หญิง) means ‘woman’. Yo Ying corresponds to the Sanskrit character ‘ञ’.

Odia Ña

Ña (ଞ) is a consonant of the Odia abugida. It ultimately arose from the Brahmi letter , via the Siddhaṃ letter  Nya. Like in other Indic scripts, Odia consonants have the inherent vowel "a", and take one of several modifying vowel signs to represent syllables with another vowel or no vowel at all.

Conjuncts of ଞ 
As is common in Indic scripts, Odia joins letters together to form conjunct consonant clusters. ଞ does not have the small subjoined form that is the most common means of conjunct formation in Odia. The second type of conjunct formation is through pure ligatures, where the constituent consonants are written together in a single graphic form. This ligature may be recognizable as being a combination of two characters or it can have a conjunct ligature unrelated to its constituent characters. For other conjuncts, an explicit Halanta is needed when adding ଞ.
 ଞ୍ (ñ) + ଚ (ca) gives the ligature ñca:

 ଞ୍ (ñ) + ଛ (cʰa) gives the ligature ñcʰa:

 ଞ୍ (ñ) + ଜ (ja) gives the ligature ñja:

 ଞ୍ (ñ) + ଝ (jʰa) gives the ligature ñjʰa:

 ଜ୍ (j) + ଞ (ña) gives the ligature jña:

Comparison of Ña
The various Indic scripts are generally related to each other through adaptation and borrowing, and as such the glyphs for cognate letters, including Ña, are related as well.

Character encodings of Ña
Most Indic scripts are encoded in the Unicode Standard, and as such the letter Ña in those scripts can be represented in plain text with unique codepoint. Ña from several modern-use scripts can also be found in legacy encodings, such as ISCII.

References

 Conjuncts are identified by IAST transliteration, except aspirated consonants are indicated with a superscript "h" to distinguish from an unaspirated cononant + Ha, and the use of the IPA "ŋ" and "ʃ" instead of the less dinstinctive "ṅ" and "ś".

Indic letters